The 31st TVyNovelas Awards, is an Academy of special awards to the best soap operas and TV shows. The awards ceremony took place on April 28, 2013 in Acapulco, Guerrero. The ceremony was televised in Mexico by Canal de las Estrellas and in the United States by Univision, which for the first time broadcast the awards simultaneously.

Yuri, Alan Tacher & Galilea Montijo hosted the show. Por ella soy Eva won six awards, the most for the evening, including Best Telenovela. Abismo de pasión also won six awards. Other winners Amor bravío and Corona de lágrimas won three awards.

Summary of awards and nominations

Winners and nominees

Teleovelas

Others

Special awards

Summary of awards and nominations

Winners and nominees

Audience's Favorites

References

External links 

TVyNovelas Awards
TVyNovelas Awards
TVyNovelas Awards
TVyNovelas Awards ceremonies